Ben Heeney (born May 13, 1992) is a former American football linebacker. He played college football at Kansas.

Early years
Heeney attended Hutchinson High School in Hutchinson, Kansas. Helping to lead the Salthawks to three state titles. He played safety and running back. As a senior, he ran for a school record 2,083 yards and 39 touchdowns. He also had 143 tackles and four interceptions. Heeney committed to the University of Kansas to play college football.

College career
Heeney played at Kansas from 2011 to 2014. As a true freshman, he played in all 12 games and had eight tackles. As a sophomore in 2012, Heeney started all 12 games, recording 112 tackles and a sack. As a junior in 2013, he played and started in 10 games, missing two due to injury. He finished the season with 88 tackles, two sacks and three interceptions. As a senior in 2014, Heeney again started all 12 games, finishing with 127 tackles, 1.5 sacks and one interception.

Professional career

Oakland Raiders
Heeney was drafted by the Oakland Raiders in the fifth round of the 2015 NFL Draft with the 140th overall pick. He was placed on injured reserve on October 4, 2016. On July 25, 2017, the Raiders placed Heeney on the Non-Football Injury List. He was waived on September 2, 2017.

New Orleans Saints
On September 22, 2017, Heeney was signed to the New Orleans Saints' practice squad. He was promoted to the active roster on September 27, 2017. He was waived on October 3, 2017.

Houston Texans
On October 4, 2017, the Houston Texans claimed Heeney off waivers. The team placed him on injured reserve on November 29, 2017.

On March 26, 2018, Heeney re-signed with the Texans. On August 29, 2018, he was waived with an injury designation by the Texans after having ankle surgery. After going unclaimed on waivers, was placed on the Texans injured reserve. He was released on September 8, 2018.

New York Guardians
Heeney was selected by the New York Guardians in round one of phase three of the 2020 XFL Draft. He had his contract terminated when the league suspended operations on April 10, 2020.

Career statistics

Career statistics accurate as of the end of the 2017 regular season.

Personal life 

Heeney is married to Taylor Alderson, and they have a son and a daughter.

References

External links
Oakland Raiders bio
Kansas Jayhawks bio

1992 births
Living people
American football linebackers
Houston Texans players
Kansas Jayhawks football players
New Orleans Saints players
New York Guardians players
Oakland Raiders players
Sportspeople from Overland Park, Kansas
Players of American football from Kansas
Sportspeople from Hutchinson, Kansas